The commemorative stelae of Nahr el-Kalb are a group of over 20 inscriptions and rock reliefs carved into the limestone rocks around the estuary of the Nahr al-Kalb (Dog River) in Lebanon, just north of Beirut.

The inscriptions include three Egyptian hieroglyphic stelae from Pharaohs including Ramesses II, six Cuneiform inscriptions from Neo-Assyrian and Neo-Babylonian kings including Esarhaddon and Nebuchadnezzar II, Roman and Greek inscriptions, Arabic inscriptions from the Egyptian Mamluk sultan Barquq and the Druze prince Fakhr-al-Din II, a memorial to Napoleon III's 1860 intervention in Lebanon and a dedication to the 1943 independence of Lebanon from France. As such, the site has been said to summarise all of Lebanon's history in one place.

In 2005, the stelae at the river were listed in the UNESCO Memory of the World initiative.

Description

Past generals and conquerors have traditionally built monuments at the mouth of the Nahr al-Kalb. Ramses II, Nebuchadnezzar, Esarhaddon, Caracalla, and even armies from modern-day France and Great Britain have engaged in this practice.

The inscriptions are carved on a strategic location commanding the North-South coastal road along the Eastern Mediterranean. The earliest inscription is that of Ramesses II, and relates to the New Kingdom of Egypt's control of the region. The earliest Egyptian incursions into the region were many centuries earlier, as recorded by the Autobiography of Weni (c. 2280 BC) and the Sebek-khu Stele (c. 1860 BC).

The earliest European to identify the site was the 17th-century traveller Henry Maundrell in 1697, who wrote of the river crossing:
To accommodate the passage, you have a path of above two yards breadth cut along its side, at a great height above the water; being the work of the emperor Antoninus... The memory of which good work is perpetuated by an inscription, engraven on a table plained in the side of the natural rock, not far from the entrance into the way... In passing this way, we observed, in the sides of the rock above us, several tables of figures carved; which seemed to promise something of antiquity... as if the old way had gone in that region, before Antoninus cut the other more convenient passage a little lower. In several places hereabouts, we saw strange antique figures of men, carved in the natural rock, and in bigness equal to the life. Close by each figure was a large table, plained in the side of the rock, and bordered round with mouldings. Both the effigies and the tables appeared to have been anciently inscribed all over: but the characters are now so defaced, that nothing but the footsteps of them were visible; only there was one of the figures that had both its lineaments and its inscriptions entire.

Inscriptions

Egyptian inscriptions
Three Egyptian hieroglyphic inscriptions are known, all of which bear the cartouche of Ramses II. This was first identified by Karl Richard Lepsius. At least one of these is thought to have been placed during the Pharaoh's first campaign in the Levant, and set the Nahr al-Kalb as the border between Egypt's province of Canaan and the possessions of the Hittites. However, the inscription is so weathered that only the name Ramesses II and the date "year 4" can be read.

Scholars such as Edward Robinson connected the Ramses II inscriptions to Sesostris, the Egyptian Pharaoh mentioned by Herodotus, in reference to Herodotus's note that "The pillars which Sesostris of Egypt set up in the various countries are for the most part no longer to be seen extant; but in Syria Palestine I myself saw them existing with the inscription upon them which I have mentioned and the emblem."

Assyrian and Babylonian inscriptions

Six cuneiform Neo-Assyrian and Neo-Babylonian inscriptions are known. The Esarhaddon stele refers to Esarhaddon's seizure of Memphis from Egyptian Pharaoh Taharqa in 671 BC. The passage is badly damaged, but is understood to include reference to the cities of Ashkelon and Tyre, as well as Taharqa and 22 vassal kings. One inscription is attributed to Nebuchadnezzar II.

A plaster cast of one of the Assyrian inscriptions became the first relic of the ancient Assyrian empire to be brought to the United Kingdom, having been prepared by Joseph Bonomi the Younger in 1834.

Classical antiquity inscriptions
A number of Greco-Roman inscriptions were carved at the site.

The most significant of these is attributed to the Legio III Gallica of Roman Emperor Caracalla (211–217 AD), who was of Punic and Syrian descent and whose official name was "Marcus Aurelius Septimius Bassianus Antoninus". The inscription is related to the road his forces built at the site. The inscription includes the words "Lyco Flumen", which provided scholars such as Edward Robinson to conclude that the Nahr el-Kalb was the ancient Lycus river.

Two of the inscriptions are in Greek, one of which still can be read as commemorating road or engineering work left by Proclus, Byzantine governor of Phoenicia in 382 AD in the 4th century in Lebanon  under Theodosius I (379–395 AD).

Islamic inscriptions
Two Arabic inscriptions are known.

The earliest was dedicated to the Mamluk sultan Barquq (1382–1399).

An inscription dedicated to Emir of Lebanon Fakhr-al-Din II (1572–1635) was noted by Henry Maundrell in 1697, but by the 19th century this inscription was no longer legible.

Colonial inscriptions
The first colonial memorial is dedicated to Napoleon III's 1860–61 intervention in Lebanon.

Two inscriptions (1919 and 1930) mark the Pursuit to Haritan, when the Allied forces took Damascus, Homs and Aleppo in October 1918 towards the end of World War I. The first inscription is dedicated to Harry Chauvel's Desert Mounted Corps, and the second to the Australian, New Zealand, Indian, and French contingents, as well as the Sharifian Army of Hussein bin Ali, Sharif of Mecca.

In October 1918, an inscription was carved to mark the British and French occupation of Beirut and Tripoli, during the Occupied Enemy Territory Administration.

The next inscription was left by French troops under General Gouraud, of the French Fourth Army, who took Damascus in July 1920 in the Battle of Maysalun. General Gouraud proclaimed the establishment of the State of Greater Lebanon on 1 September 1920.

In 1942, the Allied forces "cut in the face of the cliff an inscription commemorating the freeing of Syria and the Lebanons" from Vichy France.

Lebanese inscription
In 1946, a monument was erected in celebration of the independence of Lebanon from France, which came in 1943.

In 2000, Lebanese demonstrators, including supporters of ex-general and current politician Emile Lahoud, erected a monument to marking the departure of Israeli troops from Lebanon.

UNESCO Memory of the World
In 2005, the stelae were accepted into the UNESCO Memory of the World initiative. The application stated that the stelae "sum up the entire history of Lebanon, from High Antiquity to the present, evoking clearly the successive advances of the Pharaonic, Assyro-Babylonian, Greek, Roman, Arab, French and British armies which braved all the obstacles surrounding this difficult and very steep crossing point to carve commemorative stelae on the rocks."

Gallery

Notes

References
 
 
 UNESCO Memory of the World: Commemorative stela of Nahr el-Kalb

. Also available with full map here.

 Anne-Marie Maila-Afeiche, (ed.) ( 2009), Le Site de Nahr el-Kalb, BAAL (Bulletin d'Archéologie et d'Architecture Libanaises), Hors Serie V, Beirut, Lebanon: Ministère de la culture, Direction Générale des Antiquités

Archaeological sites in Lebanon
Ramesses II
Neo-Assyrian Empire
Inscriptions
Nahr el-Kalb
Ancient Near East steles
World Heritage Tentative List